Édouard Baumann (4 March 1895 – 12 April 1985) was a French footballer. He competed at the 1920 Summer Olympics and the 1924 Summer Olympics.

References

External links
 
 
 

1895 births
1985 deaths
French footballers
France international footballers
Olympic footballers of France
Footballers at the 1920 Summer Olympics
Footballers at the 1924 Summer Olympics
Footballers from Paris
Association football defenders